The All-NBL1 West First Team is an annual NBL1 West honour bestowed on the best players in the league each year. Under the State Basketball League (SBL) brand, a five-player team was named every year between 2005 and 2019. Alternating between the terms "All Stars", "All Star Teams" and "All-Star Five" until 2017, in 2018 and 2019 "All-SBL First Team" was used. In 2021, an All-NBL1 West First Team was named following the league's rebranding.

On a few occasions, due to the different voting systems, the Most Valuable Player has not been named in the All-Star Five / First Team.

Selections

References

First Team